Rhynencina spilogaster is a species of tephritid or fruit flies in the genus Rhynencina of the family Tephritidae.

Distribution
Mexico, Guatemala, Honduras.

References

Tephritinae
Insects described in 1979
Diptera of North America